Glyptocidaridae is a family of echinoderms belonging to the order Stomopneustoida.

Genera:
 Glyptocidaris Agassiz, 1864

References

Stomopneustoida
Echinoderm families